Edmund Wagner (5 December 1914 – 13 November 1941) was a Luftwaffe ace and recipient of the Knight's Cross of the Iron Cross during World War II.  The Knight's Cross of the Iron Cross was awarded to recognise extreme battlefield bravery or successful military leadership.  Edmund Wagner was killed on 13 November 1941 near Pawmutowka, Russia after being hit by Soviet flak.  He was posthumously awarded the Knight's Cross on 17 November 1941.  During his career he was credited with 56 Aerial victories, 55 on the Eastern Front and 1 on the Western Front.

Awards
 Flugzeugführerabzeichen
 Iron Cross (1939)
 2nd Class
 1st Class
 Front Flying Clasp of the Luftwaffe
 Ehrenpokal der Luftwaffe (1 September 1941)
 Knight's Cross of the Iron Cross on 17 November 1941 as Oberfeldwebel and pilot in the 9./Jagdgeschwader 51

References

Citations

Bibliography

External links
Aces of the Luftwaffe

1914 births
1941 deaths
People from Westerwaldkreis
German World War II flying aces
Recipients of the Knight's Cross of the Iron Cross
People from Hesse-Nassau
Luftwaffe personnel killed in World War II
Aviators killed by being shot down
Military personnel from Rhineland-Palatinate